The nearly 300 species of snake found in Colombia represent nine of the eighteen families. Six families (Aniliidae, Boidae, Colubridae, Elapidae, Tropidophiidae, Viperidae) are within the infraorder Alethinophidia (advanced snakes) and three families (Anomalepididae, Leptotyphlopidae, Typhlopidae) are within the infraorder Scolecophidia (blind snakes).

The largest snake ever known, Titanoboa, was discovered as a fossil in northeastern Colombia.

Aniliidae

Boidae

Colubridae

Elapidae

Tropidophiidae

Viperidae

Anomalepidae

Leptotyphlopidae

Typhlopidae

See also
Fauna of Colombia
Reptiles of Colombia
Lizards of Colombia

References

Further reading 
 Freiberg M. 1982. Snakes of South America. Hong Kong: T.F.H. Publications. 189 pp. .

S
Snakes
C